Pirouz Dilanchi (born Ali Ismayilfiruz, علی اسماعیل فیروز; May 1965 in Tehran, Iran) is an Iranian-Azerbaijani separatist leader.

He has also written multiple poems and is the author of eight books in Azerbaijani and Persian.

Biography
Dilanchi's scientific, literary, social, and political articles have been published in publications such as Yeni Musavat, Keyhan, Azadliq, 525-ci qezet, Edebiyyat ve Incesenet, Ettelaat in Iran and Azerbaijan.

He was purportedly arrested and tortured for his views and for participating in left-wing organizations by the Iranian government after the revolution. He then fled to the Azerbaijani SSR in 1990 to escape persecution.

He is currently a Canadian citizen and lives in Toronto, Canada.

Writing
In 1991, he created a section in the newspaper "Literature and Art" named "Literary Tabriz", which was included in every issue for a year. Later, at the initiative of Pirouz Dilanchi, a number of programs with names such as "Araz-South literature"” and "Shahriyar-South literature" were shown on Azerbaijan State Television.

Pirouz Dilanchi is a member of the Union of Azerbaijani Writers. He also claims to have written nearly 100 songs.

Politics

He is one of the founders of the South Azerbaijan National Liberation Movement and its leader.

He brought the idea of separation of "South Azerbaijan" from Iran to the attention of government officials in Azerbaijan. Because of this, Pirouz Dilanchi became the most dangerous political figure for the Iranian Government between the years 1994-2001. He has been a victim of different attacks by the Iranian government since he became very popular and important political figure acting against Iran. Even once a special terrorist group from Iran attacked him midnight in his apartment in Baku trying to kill him. After the attack terrorist group were able to escape before Azerbaijan Intelligence Officers came to the place of incident along with Azerbaijan Police.

Dilanchi collected about 3000 signatures in 2000 and suggested his candidacy to the Azerbaijan Republic Parliament in order to participate in the next election. His candidacy was officially registered but was denied before the elections by pressure from the mafia responsible for elections. Central Elections Committee ignored the registered candidacy of Dilanchi, citing unfair and contradicting pretexts.

Kidnapping
Dilanchi was kidnapped by an unknown group in front of his house on 5 December 2002. As a result of pressure, the media kept his location secret for 21 days, however, the Press Secretary of the Internal Affairs Ministry declared that he was in jail. After being kept some weeks in the cold underground in inhumane conditions, Dilanchi was sent to Shuvalan prison. After 38 days in prison, having been arrested without reason, he was allowed to be transferred to house arrest. After three months, he was freed.

References

External links
Official website
Republic of Azerbaijan Ministry of Foreign Affairs: Piruz Dilanci, a leader of the National Liberation Movement of Southern Azerbaijan (NLMSA) and a well-known poet... 
The Armenian-Iran Relationship (A book published by ESISC - European Strategic Intelligence and Security Center on 17 January 2013) Page 39: Azerbaijan also accused Iran of having ordered the killing of Iranian Azeri leader Piruz Dilanci, who was living in Baku139. It is lastly worth mentioning that Iran also expressed his deep discontent over the efforts of the Azerbaijani authorities to organize a diaspora through the World Azerbaijani Congress.
The head of the National Liberation Movement of Southern Azerbaijan Piruz Dilanci, has been arrested.
It was not just the Caspian Sea crisis that preoccupied Tehran. On August 22, in the midst of concerns with the Kurds, Turks, Israelis and Americans, the Azeri question again came to the fore. On that day there was a failed assassination attempt on Piruz Dilanci, leader of the National Liberation Movement of Southern Azerbaijan (NLMSA), at his home in Baku. Dilanci did not rule out that the assassination attempt might have been organized by Tehran's agents. (29) The NLMSA was organized in the early 1990s by a group of political emigres from Iran of Azeri origin. The NLMSA declared its principal goal was the independence of Southern Azerbaijan, i.e., Iran-Azerbaijan...
Azerbaijan also accused Iran of having ordered the killing of Iranian Azeri leader Piruz Dilanci, who was living in Baku. It is lastly worth mentioning that Iran also expressed his deep discontent over the efforts of the Azerbaijani authorities to organize a diaspora through the World Azerbaijani Congress...
Nuray Hafiftash - "O gelende" (music: Eldar Mansurov, Piruz Dilenchi)
Representatives of the National Liberation Movement of Southern Azerbaijan (NLMSA) in different countries have issued a statement in connection with the arrest of the head of the organization's Baku office, Piruz Dilanci...
Azerbaijanian Music - Girls, Eldar Mansurov, Piruz Dilenchi
Piruz Dilanci has been arrested
Azerbaijanian Music - Veten Saqolsun, Eldar Mansurov, Piruz Dilenchi
Russian Military-Security Media Coverage: Piruz Dilanci, has recently been attacked by employees of the Iranian Embassy at Baku's Bina airport. Ezzatollah Jalali, Ali Mehri and others were among the attackers. The incident was stopped due to police intervention...
Azerbaijanian Music - Bes hardasan sevgilim (Piruz Dilenchi, Teymur Mustafayev)
The South Azerbaijan National Liberation Movement is about to hold its next, 3rd in turn Congress in Baku.The press office of the movement told AssA-Irada that the organisation has commissioned its Baku representative Piruz Dilanci with talking with the Azerbaijani government over getting permission to venue place...
http://news.bbc.co.uk

20th-century Iranian politicians
Iranian prisoners and detainees
Amnesty International prisoners of conscience held by Iran
Azerbaijani-language poets
Azerbaijani-language writers
1965 births
Living people
Politicians from Tehran
Writers from Tehran
Naturalized citizens of Canada
Iranian emigrants to Canada
20th-century Iranian poets
Separatists
Azerbaijani poets
Naturalized citizens by country
People with acquired Canadian citizenship
Canadian people of Azerbaijani descent
Iranian Azerbaijanis
Canadian politicians of Iranian descent
Azerbaijani emigrants to Canada
21st-century Iranian poets